Gutorm Gjessing (4 April 1906 – 27 April 1979) was a Norwegian archaeologist and ethnographer. He was director of the Ethnographic Museum  at the University of Oslo and as  major contributor to Circumpolar studies.

Biography
Gjessing was born  at  Ålesund in  Møre og Romsdal, Norway. He was the son of parish priest Marcus Jacob Gjessing (1871–1947) and Julie Kathrine Monrad (1877–1951).

Gjessing studied art at Oslo Cathedral School in 1924. He attended the University of Oslo where he received his Master's degree in archeology in 1931 and defended his doctoral dissertation in 1934.  From 1936 to 1940 he was employed as a curator in archeology at Tromsø Museum and was curator in archeology at the university's Antiquities Collection from 1940 to 1946.  In the period 1947–1973, he worked as a director of the Ethnographic Museum (now Museum of Cultural History, Oslo) at the University of Oslo.  

During 1946–1947, he was in the United States as a Rockefeller Fellow.
In 1952, Gjessing was invited as a guest lecturer at the London School of Economics.
He was an honorary member of the  Royal Anthropological Institute of Great Britain and Ireland.
He was awarded the Fridtjof Nansen Prize for Outstanding Research and the Qvigstad Medal.

Selected works
Trænfunnene (1943)
Yngre steinalder i Nord-Norge (1942)
Norges steinalder (1945)

References

External links
Gutorm Gjessing Lecture Series

Norwegian ethnographers
Archaeologists from Oslo
1906 births
1979 deaths
20th-century archaeologists
 University of Oslo alumni 
People from Ålesund